Arda Kalpakian (born April 11, 1944) is a Lebanese Olympic athlete. She represented Lebanon in 1972 Summer Olympics in Munich, and was eliminated after she came in last in her heat in round one.

Olympic participation

München 1972
Kalpakian and Ani Jane Mugrditchian were the only female participants for Lebanon in that tournament among a total of 18 participant for Lebanon.

Athletics – Women's 400 metres – Round One

References

1960 births
Living people
Lebanese female sprinters
Olympic athletes of Lebanon
Athletes (track and field) at the 1972 Summer Olympics
Olympic female sprinters